Avau is an Austronesian language of West New Britain, Papua New Guinea.

References

External links 
 The HS1 collection in Kaipuleohone includes open access recordings of the Avau language.

Arawe languages
Languages of West New Britain Province